In Soviet times, the Abkhazian ASSR was divided into six raions (districts) named after their respective capitals. 

The administrative divisions of the disputed Republic of Abkhazia have stayed the same, with one exception: in 1995 the Tkvarcheli District was created around the town of Tkvarcheli from parts of the Ochamchira and Gali raions. 

The Georgian government, which claims Abkhazia as an Autonomous region but lacks control, has not changed the Soviet divisions.

Districts of Abkhazia

Districts are led by the Head of the Administration, who is simultaneously Mayor of the District's capital, except in the case of Sukhumi. The Head of the Administration is appointed by the President following consultations with the District Assembly. Previously, the Head was appointed from among the District Assembly members, but without consultations, but in practice the President would often appoint an acting Head from without who was subsequently elected to the Assembly. The current procedure was adopted by the People's Assembly of Abkhazia on 29 January 2016, over competing proposals to elect the Head directly by the District's population or by Assembly members, and after voting almost unanimously not to change the previous procedure on 30 July 2015.

 (1) Gagra
 (2) Gudauta
 (3) Sukhumi
 (4) Gulripshi
 (5) Ochamchira
 (6) Tkvarcheli
 (7) Gali

Towns of Abkhazia

Gagra
Gali
Gudauta
New Athos
Ochamchire
Pitsunda (since 2007)
Sukhumi
Tkvarcheli

Urban settlements of  Abkhazia
Bzyb
Gulripshi
Leselidze
Myussera
Gantiadi

Historic regions of Abkhazia
Abkhazia has traditionally been divided into several historical regions (they roughly correspond to modern districts that are given in parentheses):

Sadzen (Gagra district and Sochi region which is now in Russia)
Bzyb (Gudauta district)
Gumaa (Sukhumi district)
Abzhywa (Ochamchira and partly Tkvarcheli districts)
Samurzakano (Gali and partly Tkvarcheli district)
Dal-Tsabal (Gulripshi district)

These are the regions mentioned in the Abkhazian Constitution of 1994. According to the popular (but erroneous) belief the seven stripes of the Abkhazian flag correspond to the seven historical regions of the country, the seventh one being Pskhu-Aibga.

See also

References